Ian Morison FRAS (born 22 November 1943) is an astronomer and astrophysicist who served as the 35th Gresham Professor of Astronomy.

Life 

Morison was born in Felpham, England.  He attended Chichester High School before going on to study Physics, Mathematics and Astronomy at Hertford College, University of Oxford.  He lives in Macclesfield, England with his wife Judy.

Career and recognition

Jodrell Bank Centre for Astrophysics 

Morison joined the University of Manchester's Jodrell Bank Observatory as a research student in 1965 before becoming a staff member in 1970.  Initially working on data acquisition systems for the observatory's own instruments including the Lovell and Mk II radio telescopes, he went on to play a key role in the development of MERLIN, an array of radio telescopes with a resolution in the radio spectrum comparable to that of the Hubble Space Telescope in the optical.

Gresham College 

On 1 August 2007 Morison was appointed as the 35th Gresham Professor of Astronomy, a position previously held by Christopher Wren. He followed John D. Barrow and preceded Carolin Crawford. In this role he delivered a series of 25 public lectures on astronomy and astrophysics. The four-year period of Gresham Professorship came to an end in August 2011.

Association with Astronomical Societies 

Morison is a founding member and now patron of Macclesfield Astronomical Society.  He is a former council member and president of the Society for Popular Astronomy and patron of Ewell Astronomical Society.

Asteroid 

Main belt asteroid 15727 Ianmorison was named after Morison.

Journals 

 
 
 
 Lyne, A. G.; Morison, I (2017). "The Lovell Telescope and its role in pulsar astronomy". Nature Astronomy. Volume 1 835–840

Bibliography 

 Astronomy (2004, w. Margaret Penston) 
 Pocket Guide to Stars and Planets (2005, w. Margaret Penston) 
 Introduction to Astronomy and Cosmology (2008) 
 An Amateur's Guide to Observing and Imaging the Heavens  (2014) 
 A Journey through the Universe: Gresham Lectures on Astronomy (2014) 
 The Art of Astrophotography (2017)

See also 

 Gresham Professor of Astronomy

References

External links 
 The Night Sky - Jodrell Bank Observatory's monthly guide to the moon, stars and planets compiled by Ian Morison

Academics of the University of Manchester
Professors of Gresham College
Alumni of Hertford College, Oxford
1943 births
Living people
20th-century British astronomers
21st-century British astronomers
Jodrell Bank Observatory
Fellows of the Royal Astronomical Society
People from Felpham